The IZh-54 (ИЖ-54) is a Soviet double-barreled shotgun.

History 
IZh-54 was designed in 1951-1954, since 1954 began its serial production.

Since 1961, a new varnish with improved characteristics has been used to protect the wooden parts of the gun.

In December 1964, the price of one standard IZh-54 was 90 roubles. The price of one custom IZh-54 shotgun (with engravings, walnut stock and walnut fore-end) was between 170 and 250 roubles.

In total, 477 695 IZh-54 shotguns were made from 1954 to 1969 and more than seventy thousands of them were sold to foreign countries.

It was the first shotgun of the Izhevsk Mechanical Plant that was sold abroad in large quantities.

In January 1980, a detachable diopter sight was proposed for IZh-54 shotguns.

Design 
IZh-54 is a side by side hammerless smoothbore shotgun.

It has a walnut or beech stock and fore-end.
It has a chrome-plated bores made from ar50 steel.

Variants 
 IZh-57 (ИЖ-57) - 16 gauge variant, since 1957

Users 

 
  - unknown number of shotguns were sold as civilian hunting weapon
  - the import was allowed

References

Sources 
 Основы спортивной охоты (охотминимум) / колл. авт., ред. И. Д. Гулевич. М., Воениздат, 1957. стр.120-122
 Охотничье двуствольное ружьё ИЖ-54 // Охотничье, спортивное огнестрельное оружие. Каталог. М., 1958. стр.32-33
 Двуствольное охотничье ружьё ИЖ-54 // Спортивно-охотничье оружие и патроны. Бухарест, "Внешторгиздат", 1965. стр.28-29
 Ю. Константинов. ИЖ-54 глазами владельца // журнал "Мастер-ружьё", № 12, 2013. стр.42-44
 Ю. Максимов. "Модель ИЖ-54". Причины популярности 60 лет спустя // журнал "Мастер-ружьё", № 5, 2018. стр.48-55

Double-barreled shotguns of the Soviet Union
Izhevsk Mechanical Plant products
Weapons and ammunition introduced in 1954